Causeyella causeyae, Causey's cave millipede, is a millipede, ghostly white in color, which was first noticed, but not identified, in 1964. It was discovered in caves in Arkansas in 2004. It has been found in 10 caves in Izard, Independence, and Stone counties.

References

Cave millipedes
Animals described in 2003
Chordeumatida
Endemic fauna of Arkansas